Community Coffee is a coffee roaster and distributor based in Baton Rouge, Louisiana, United States.  As of 2005, it was the largest family-owned coffee brand in the United States, controlling 52% of the market in South Louisiana and 72% in Baton Rouge, and employing 850 people.  The company has distribution throughout markets in the Southeastern United States.

Community Coffee originated in 1919 when company founder Norman "Cap" Saurage began experimenting with coffee blends at his two grocery stores in downtown Baton Rouge.  Demand for the coffee increased to the extent that by 1923 Saurage moved his coffee production to a converted barn, and in 1924 left his grocery business to focus on coffee.

In the late 1950s and early 1960s, Jim Henson made a series of commercials for Community starring early Muppets characters Wilkins and Wontkins. These were remakes of commercials originally produced for the Wilkins coffee company. The commercials became a meme with the advent of Youtube.

The company now imports coffee beans from Brazil, Colombia, and Mexico through ports in New Orleans and Houston.  Since 1988, it has run a program in which UPC labels from its products can be redeemed for donations to Louisiana schools. In 2002 Community entered into a deal with the Abahuzamugambi farming cooperative in Rwanda, facilitated by the PEARL agricultural program, to purchase Maraba coffee.  This was the first direct contract between an African farming cooperative and American coffee roaster.

In 1995, Community Coffee began opening a chain of retail coffeehouses throughout Louisiana.  Community also launched stores in Texas and Alabama, however, ventures in neighboring states failed due to the entrenchment of Starbucks and local brands. In 2013,  Community spun off its coffee house business into a separate company named CC's Coffee House in order to facilitate out-of-state expansion.  CC's remains under the ownership of the Saurage family.

See also 

 Maraba Coffee
 PJ's Coffee

References

Companies based in Baton Rouge, Louisiana
Coffee brands
Food and drink companies based in Louisiana
Coffee companies of the United States